Methodist College may refer to:

Methodist University in North Carolina (formerly Methodist College)
Methodist College of UnityPoint Health in Peoria, IL
Nebraska Methodist College in Omaha, NE
Methodist College (Kowloon) in Yau Ma Tei, Hong Kong
Sha Tin Methodist College in Sha Tin, Hong Kong
Methodist College Belfast
Southern Methodist University
Methodist College, Colombo, in Sri Lanka
Methodist Girls' High School, Point Pedro, in Sri Lanka

See also
International Association of Methodist-related Schools, Colleges, and Universities